Charles Neaves, Lord Neaves FRSE (14 October 1800 – 23 December 1876) was a Scottish advocate, judge, theologian and writer.  He served as Solicitor General (1852), as a judge of the Court of Session, the supreme court of Scotland (1854), and as Rector of the University of St Andrews (1872).

Neaves was known as one of the early analysts of the history of evolution, and is often quoted regarding the subjects of evolution and women's rights.

Life
Neaves was born in Edinburgh on 14 October 1800, the son of Charles Neaves (1777-1868), a Forfar solicitor and clerk of the Justiciary Court in Edinburgh, and his first wife. His father later married Mary Anne Wilson (1792-1887), sister of John and James Wilson.

Neaves was educated at the High School and Edinburgh University. He became a member of the Faculty of Advocates at age 22. He married Eliza Macdonald in 1835. They lived (c. 1833) in a large Georgian townhouse at 47 Queen Street in Edinburgh's New Town. They moved in 1845 to the more prestigious address of 7 Charlotte Square.

From 1841 to 1845, he was Advocate Depute, and from 1845 to 1852 Sheriff of Orkney and Shetland.  He became Solicitor General for Scotland in 1853, being succeeded by Robert Handyside, Lord Handyside. He served as a judge of the Court of Session from 1853 to 1858.  From 1858 to his death, he was Lord of Justiciary, Scotland's supreme criminal court. Neaves lived the majority of his life in Edinburgh, but when associated with the Justiciary Court, he travelled to Glasgow thrice yearly and Lord Neaves (although elderly and almost without hearing capability by the 1875) acquired a reputation in Glasgow as a man of justice and evenness.

Charles Neaves had acknowledged skills as a composer of verse.

He was vice-president of the Royal Society of Edinburgh (1859–67, 1868–73 and 1874–76), and a president of the Heriot-Watt Institution. From 1872 to 1874, he held the post of Rector at the University of St Andrews, the oldest university in Scotland. The Rector chairs meetings of the University Court, the governing body of the University of St Andrews. Neaves was a regular author of poetry and essays to Blackwood's Magazine, only a fraction of his work having been republished.

He is buried in the family plot in Warriston Cemetery in Edinburgh with his second wife, Elisabeth MacDonald (1811-1888). His first wife, Mary Anne, is buried in a south section of Dean Cemetery.

Evolutionary analyst

As a judge of the Court of Session, Neaves was familiar with one of his predecessors, James Burnett, Lord Monboddo, to whom he credited the origination of the concepts of the theory of evolution. In 1875, Neaves published a poem within a book of verse to establish this point:

In another instance he elaborates on Monboddo's writings again in Blackwood's Magazine, indicating the clarity with which Monboddo foresaw evolutionary theory:

Poet and critic
Not only did Neaves produce poetry but he was a prolific critic, often in venues such as Blackwood's Magazine. One of his thematic elements was virtue, which naturally tied to his theological roots.  He also conducted critiques of others' poetry based upon how their attitudes deviated from virtue and a common theme of under-recognition of women, as in the scalding criticism of the poet Thomas Carew.

Quotations
In Bartlett's Familiar Quotations (Quote number 6171), as published originally in Darwin's The Origin of Species, he quipped on the subject of evolution:
 

This quote became so famous in that early era that the authorship of the quotation became a matter of public dispute. Although Bartlett and Darwin clearly attributed the quotation to Neaves, Zachary Macaulay argued that he had made this statement three years earlier.

Lord Neaves may have also been an early thinker on the issue of women's rights with the following quote, that would have bordered on heresy in his era:

See also

History of evolution

References

External links

 
Bannatyne Club papers with register of selected papers relating to Neaves and contemporaries
Reference to marriage contract with Eliza MacDonald

1800 births
1876 deaths
19th-century Scottish judges
Lawyers from Edinburgh
People educated at the Royal High School, Edinburgh
Alumni of the University of Edinburgh
Fellows of the Royal Society of Edinburgh
Members of the Faculty of Advocates
People associated with Heriot-Watt University
Rectors of the University of St Andrews
Scottish essayists
Neaves
Scottish poets
Solicitors General for Scotland
Scottish sheriffs
19th-century poets
19th-century essayists
Burials at Warriston Cemetery
Writers from Edinburgh